Augurio Maranon Abeto (1900-1977) was an essayist in Hiligaynon during the Golden Age of Hiligaynon Literature. He was also a Municipal President (modern equivalent to Mayor) during 1940s.

He is the composer of the Visayan song, Dalawidaw.

References

Visayan writers
Filipino writers
Hiligaynon people
20th-century Filipino people
1900 births
1977 deaths
Date of birth missing
Date of death missing